Ochromolopis incrassa is a moth in the family Epermeniidae. It was described by Clarke in 1971. It is found on the Austral Islands of French Polynesia.

References

Moths described in 1971
Epermeniidae
Moths of Oceania